The 1997 Winston-Salem mayoral election was held on November 7, 1997 to elect the mayor of Winston-Salem, North Carolina. It saw the election of Jack Canvanagh, who defeated incumbent mayor Martha Wood.

Primaries
The date of the primaries was September 26, 1997.

Democratic primary

Republican primary

General election

References 

Winston-Salem
Mayoral elections in Winston-Salem, North Carolina
Winston-Salem